Well Oiled is the first recorded collaboration between Bardo Pond and Roy Montgomery, released under the name Hash Jar Tempo on March 17, 1997 by Drunken Fish Records.

Reception 
Ned Raggett of AllMusic praised the album, writing that "it very much is what is promised, a collaboration between Roy Montgomery and Bardo Pond that lives up to the experimental and exploratory heights both are easily capable of. [...] Unlike the group's semi-namesake, Hash Jar Tempo doesn't punish and haunt so much as it does engagingly trip out, with the right head-nodding pace and echoing chimes that will attract both older stoners and younger shoegaze freaks. There are certainly some pretty intense moments, though -- the fourth track is one of the best, a subtly relentless freakout that feels like slow magma crushing everything before it, with some wild guitar work deep in the mix." Italian magazine OndaRock named it one of their "milestone" albums, with Francesco Nunziata calling the album a "masterpiece" & comparing the music to acts as diverse as Popol Vuh, Klaus Schulze, Chrome & early Pink Floyd. The magazine's editors would go on to rank it the 17th best psychedelic album of all time.

Track listing

Personnel
Adapted from the Well Oiled liner notes.

Hash Jar Tempo
Joe Culver – drums
John Gibbons – guitar
Michael Gibbons – guitar
Roy Montgomery – guitar
Clint Takeda – bass guitar

Production and additional personnel
Drugfish – art direction

Release history

References

External links 
 Well Oiled at Discogs (list of releases)

1997 debut albums
Hash Jar Tempo albums
Drunken Fish Records albums